12 Aquilae (abbreviated 12 Aql) is a star in the equatorial constellation of Aquila. 12 Aquilae does not have a Bayer designation and is most easily recognized in the sky being next to the brighter star λ (lambda) Aquilae.

This star has an apparent visual magnitude of 4.02, which is bright enough to be seen with the naked eye, although, according to the Bortle Dark-Sky Scale, it is a challenge to view from the inner city. This is an evolved giant star of stellar class K1 III. It has 12 times the radius of the Sun and shines with 60 times the Sun's luminosity. This energy is being radiated from its outer atmosphere at an effective temperature of 4,603 K, giving it the cool orange hue of a K-type star.

References

External links
 The Constellations and Named Stars
 Image 12 Aquilae
 HR 7193

Aquilae, i
176678
Aquila (constellation)
Suspected variables
K-type giants
093429
Aquilae, 12
7193
Durchmusterung objects